Dicerca pectorosa is a species of beetle from the family Buprestidae first described by John Lawrence LeConte in 1857. It can be found in North America from British Columbia, Southern Alberta and Saskatchewan, as well as south to California and Montana. It feeds on various Prunus species.

References

Beetles described in 1857
Beetles of North America
Buprestidae
Taxa named by John Lawrence LeConte